Viktar Khilmonchyk is a paralympic athlete from Belarus competing mainly in category F42 shot put and discus events.

Viktar has competed in the F42 class shot and discus at each of the 2000, 2004 and 2008 Summer Paralympics.  He won the bronze in the discus in 2000 and the silver in the shot at both the 2000 and 2004 games but was unable to win anything in the 2008 event.

References

Paralympic athletes of Belarus
Athletes (track and field) at the 2000 Summer Paralympics
Athletes (track and field) at the 2004 Summer Paralympics
Athletes (track and field) at the 2008 Summer Paralympics
Paralympic silver medalists for Belarus
Paralympic bronze medalists for Belarus
Living people
Medalists at the 2000 Summer Paralympics
Medalists at the 2004 Summer Paralympics
Year of birth missing (living people)
Paralympic medalists in athletics (track and field)
Belarusian male discus throwers
Belarusian male shot putters
Discus throwers with limb difference
Shot putters with limb difference
Paralympic discus throwers
Paralympic shot putters